Shivam Sadana (born 15 July 1992) is an Indian Punjabi/Hindi singer, rapper and songwriter from Uttarakhand associated with the Punjabi music industry. Known for his Punjabi songs like 'Paave Gucci', 'Kaint Teri nazran' and 'Soniye kyun'.

Education and career 
Shivam Sadana was born in 1992 in Haridwar. He has done his schooling from the Indian Public School Dehradun. Later he completed BBA from Amity University, Noida.

Sadana started his career as a Youtube singer. He released his first song "Aa bhi jana" in 2019 and began to become more well-known following the publication of his song "Tu Mila"

Discography 
 Chal Humsafar
 Paave Gucci
 Tu Mila
 Love Struggle
 Shehenshah
 Kaint Teri Nazran
 Soniye Kyun

References

External links 
 Shivam Sadana on iTunes

1992 births
Living people
Indian singers